Mr. and Mrs. Used to Be is the first collaborative studio album by American country music singers Ernest Tubb and Loretta Lynn. It was released on August 2, 1965, by Decca Records.

Critical reception

Billboard published a review in the issue dated August 14, 1965, which said, "This album pairing two of the greatest names in country music, Ernest Tubb and Loretta Lynn, should be a great sales explosion. "Mr. and Mrs. Used to Be", a real tearjerker, is combined with the classic "A Dear John Letter" and the country hit "Just Between the Two of Us". All standouts."

Commercial performance 
The album debuted at No. 20 on the US Billboard Hot Country Albums chart dated October 9, 1965. It would later peak at No. 13 on the chart dated October 30. The album would spend a total of 10 weeks on the chart.

The album's first single, "Mr. and Mrs. Used to Be", was released in June 1964 and peaking at No. 11 on the US Billboard Hot Country Singles chart, the biggest hit the duo would achieve. The second single, "Our Hearts Are Holding Hands", was released in May 1965 and peaked at No. 24.

Recording
Recording for the album took place over four sessions at Columbia Recording Studio in Nashville, Tennessee, beginning on March 10, 1964. Three additional sessions followed on January 12, 18, and 19, 1965.

Track listing

Personnel 
Adapted from the Decca recording session records.
Owen Bradley – producer
Buddy Charleton – steel guitar
Jack Drake – bass
Jack Greene – drums
Loretta Lynn – lead vocals
Bill Pursell – piano
Leon Rhodes – guitar
Jerry Shook – guitar
Cal Smith – guitar
Jerry Smith – piano
Ernest Tubb – lead vocals, liner notes

Charts
Album

Singles

References 

Vocal duet albums
Ernest Tubb albums
Loretta Lynn albums
Albums produced by Owen Bradley
1965 albums
Decca Records albums